King Monkey may refer to:

 Ian Brown (born 1963), English musician
 Sun Wukong, a character in Chinese mythology